Anjunabeats Worldwide 02 is the second compilation album in the Anjunabeats Worldwide compilation series. It is mixed and compiled by Finnish trance duo Super8 & Tab and English trance producer Mat Zo, and was released 10 May 2010 on Anjunabeats. The compilation is named after the radio show of the same name, which airs every Sunday evening on the internet radio Digitally Imported.

Track listing

References

Electronic compilation albums
2010 compilation albums
Trance compilation albums